Garry Power (born 1 September 1962) is an Irish bobsledder. He competed in the four man event at the 1998 Winter Olympics.

References

External links
 

1962 births
Living people
Irish male bobsledders
Olympic bobsledders of Ireland
Bobsledders at the 1998 Winter Olympics
Place of birth missing (living people)